Nicholas Opoku (born 11 August 1997) is a Ghanaian professional footballer who plays as a defender for French club Amiens, on loan from Udinese. He has also been capped at the international level.

Club career
Opoku started his career with Kumasi Corner Babies, before moving to top-tier club Berekum Chelsea. On 11 August 2017, he signed a three-year deal with Tunisian club Club Africain.

On 13 July 2018, Opoku signed with Serie A side Udinese until 30 June 2022.

On 28 January 2020, Opoku joined Ligue 1 club Amiens on loan with an option to buy until 30 June 2020.

International career
Opoku was a part of the Ghana under 17 squad that competed in 2013 African U-17 Championship. He has also represented the Ghana under-20 team.

In July 2017, Opoku made his senior international debut in a 2–1 defeat against United States. He came as a 38th minute substitute for Rashid Sumaila following his knee injury.

In April 2021, The Court of Arbitration for Sport asked Tunisian side Club Africain to pay him US$279,500 after  repeated failure to be pay his salary, which lead  termination of  his contract wihh the club  in June 2018.

References

External links

1997 births
Footballers from Kumasi
Living people
Association football defenders
Ghanaian footballers
Berekum Chelsea F.C. players
Club Africain players
Udinese Calcio players
Amiens SC players
Ghana international footballers
Ghana under-20 international footballers
Ghanaian expatriate footballers
Serie A players
Ligue 1 players
Expatriate footballers in Tunisia
Expatriate footballers in Italy
Expatriate footballers in France
Ghanaian expatriate sportspeople in Tunisia
Ghanaian expatriate sportspeople in Italy
Ghanaian expatriate sportspeople in France